John Headley Shott (born June 24, 1948 in Bluefield, West Virginia) is an American politician and a Republican member of the West Virginia House of Delegates representing District 27 since January 12, 2013. Shott served non-consecutively from January 2009 in the District 24 seat until his appointment May 19, 2010 to the West Virginia Senate District 10 seat to fill the vacancy caused by the death of Senator Don Caruth until January 2011.

Education
Shott earned his BS in psychology from Davidson College and his JD from the University of North Carolina School of Law.

Elections
2012 Redistricted to District 27, Shott ran in the three-way May 8, 2012 Republican Primary and placed first by 5 votes with 1,586 votes (33.9%), and placed first in the six-way November 6, 2012 General election with 10,998 votes (22.2%) ahead of fellow Republican nominees Joe Ellington and Marty Gearheart and Democratic nominees Ryan Flanigan, Greg Ball, and Bill Morefield, who had run for a District 25 seat in 2006 and 2010.
2008 Initially in District 24, Shott ran in the four-way May 13, 2008 Republican Primary, winning with 469 votes (65.4%); and won the November 4, 2008 General election with 3,144 votes (53.6%) against Democratic nominee Mike Vinciguerra.

References

External links
Official page at the West Virginia Legislature

John Shott at Ballotpedia
John H. Shott at OpenSecrets

1948 births
Living people
Davidson College alumni
Republican Party members of the West Virginia House of Delegates
People from Bluefield, West Virginia
University of North Carolina School of Law alumni
West Virginia lawyers
Republican Party West Virginia state senators
21st-century American politicians